{{DISPLAYTITLE:Phi1 Ceti}}

Phi1 Ceti is a single star located in the equatorial constellation of Cetus. It is visible to the naked eye with an apparent visual magnitude of +4.78. Based upon an annual parallax shift of 13.96 mas, it is located about 234 light years from the Sun. Based upon the motion of this star through space, Phi1 Ceti is a probable member of the proposed Wolf 630 moving group. This is a set of stars centered on Wolf 630 that are moving nearly in parallel and have an age of around  billion years. They may be former members of a dissolved open cluster.

At an age of about 2.21 billion years, Phi1 Ceti is an evolved red clump giant star with a stellar classification of K0 III. It is presently on the horizontal branch and is generating energy through the nuclear fusion of helium at its core. The star is suspected of variability; it has been measured to vary between magnitudes 4.75 and 4.78. It has 1.6 times the mass of the Sun and has expanded to 11 times the Sun's radius. The star is radiating 54 times the luminosity of the Sun from its enlarged photosphere at an effective temperature of 4,775 K.

References

K-type giants
Horizontal-branch stars
Suspected variables

Cetus (constellation)
Ceti, Phi1
Durchmusterung objects
Ceti, 17
004188
003455
0194